One vote can refer to:

 One man, one vote, a political slogan
 one member, one vote, an election process in the UK and Canada
 One share, one vote, a standard in corporate governance
 one vote, one value, an election principle in Australia
 ONE Vote, a campaign run by the ONE Campaign

See also
 List of close election results, for a list of election decided by a single vote